Curtis Paper Mill Workers' Houses is set of historic include single and two multi-family dwellings located at Newark in New Castle County, Delaware.  They were built about 1888, and include two rectangular  story frame structures which served as multi-family worker's dwellings, and one  story, single family house which was used as the superintendents house.  One building contains four family units, while the next building to the north houses two family units.  They were built to house workers at the Curtis Paper Mill.

It was added to the National Register of Historic Places in 1982.

References

Houses on the National Register of Historic Places in Delaware
Houses completed in 1888
Houses in Newark, Delaware
National Register of Historic Places in New Castle County, Delaware